Lentilly is a commune in the Rhône department in eastern France.

Population

See also
Communes of the Rhône department

References

Communes of Rhône (department)
Rhône communes articles needing translation from French Wikipedia